Adélard Henry "Adie, Del" Lafrance (January 13, 1913 – June 19, 1995) was a Canadian professional ice hockey player. He played three games in the National Hockey League for the Montreal Canadiens but most of his career was spent in minor professional leagues. His death of June 19, 1995, was confirmed with the McGuinty funeral home in North Bay, Ontario.

Playing career
Born in Chapleau, Ontario, in 1913, Lafrance joined the Sudbury St. Louis of the Nickel Belt Hockey League in 1929–30. The following season he moved to the Sudbury Cub Wolves in time for the playoffs and Memorial Cup play. The following season he split between the St. Louis and the Wolves, and played in Memorial Cup and Allan Cup playoffs. That season, 1931–32, the Wolves were the Memorial Cup champions. He played one final season for the Wolves before joining the professional Falconbridge in 1933–34. In March 1934, he joined the Montreal Canadiens and played three games in the season and two in the playoffs without scoring a goal. The following season he was with the Quebec Castors of the Can-Am league. He played one season for Quebec before joining the Springfield Indians for four seasons. He left competitive hockey after the 1938–39 season and he returned to Sudbury to join the family business, A. Lafrance & Son's Furriers LTD.

References

External links

1913 births
1995 deaths
Canadian ice hockey left wingers
Franco-Ontarian people
Ice hockey people from Ontario
Montreal Canadiens players
People from Chapleau, Ontario
Quebec Castors players